Ángela María Figueroa Palacios (born 28 June 1984 in Bogotá), known as Ángela Figueroa, is a Colombian athlete who specialises in the 3000 metres steeplechase. She competed at the 2012 Summer Olympics, placing 43rd overall.

Personal bests
3000 m: 9:43.02– Cáceres, Spain, 30 June 2010
5000 m: 16:08.43 – Walnut, California, United States 19 April 2013
10,000 m: 34:22.45 – Buenos Aires, Argentina 5 June 2011
3000 m steeplechase: 9:42.71– Río de Janeiro, Brazil 20 May 2012

Competition record

References

External links 
 

1984 births
Living people
Sportspeople from Bogotá
Colombian female steeplechase runners
Olympic athletes of Colombia
Athletes (track and field) at the 2012 Summer Olympics
Athletes (track and field) at the 2007 Pan American Games
Athletes (track and field) at the 2011 Pan American Games
World Athletics Championships athletes for Colombia
Pan American Games medalists in athletics (track and field)
Pan American Games silver medalists for Colombia
South American Games gold medalists for Colombia
South American Games silver medalists for Colombia
South American Games medalists in athletics
Central American and Caribbean Games gold medalists for Colombia
Competitors at the 2006 South American Games
Competitors at the 2014 South American Games
Competitors at the 2010 Central American and Caribbean Games
Competitors at the 2014 Central American and Caribbean Games
Central American and Caribbean Games medalists in athletics
Medalists at the 2011 Pan American Games
21st-century Colombian women